Larry Pollard (born 5 May 1954) is a former Canadian NASCAR Busch Grand National Series driver. During his career, Pollard was the crew chief for NASCAR drivers Richard Petty and Phil Parsons during the 1980s before starting his Busch Series racing career in 1985. As a racecar driver, Pollard became the first non-American driver to win a Busch Grand National event after his win during the 1987 Busch 200 at Langley Speedway. Pollard was inducted into the Victoria Auto Racing Hall of Fame in 2003.

Early life
Pollard was born on 5 May 1954 in Victoria, British Columbia.

Career
Pollard began his racing career as a stock car racer in Victoria during the 1970s. At the beginning of the 1980s, Pollard became a NASCAR pit crew member in the Winston West Series for driver Roy Smith. After two years with Smith, Pollard went to the Busch Grand National Series and continued his pit crew career for Ricky Rudd in 1982. Between 1982 and 1984, Pollard was a pit crew chief for Richard Petty before ending his crew chief career with Phil Parsons in 1985.

As a NASCAR driver, Pollard competed in the Busch Grand National Series from 1985 to 1990 while appearing in four races during the 1987 NASCAR Winston Cup Series season.
While in the Busch Series, he won the 1987 Busch 200 at Langley Speedway and became the first non-American driver to win a Busch Series event. 
At the 1988 Budweiser 200 at Dover International Speedway, Pollard crashed into a wall during the 195th lap and acquired a basilar skull fracture. After coming out of a coma, Pollard returned to racing during the 1989 NASCAR Busch Series. After Pollard's final Busch Series race in 1990, Pollard briefly drove in the NASCAR AutoZone Elite Division, Southeast Series during the early 1990s and the Pro All Stars Series in the mid 2000s.

Awards and honours
In 2003, Pollard was inducted into the Victoria Auto Racing Hall of Fame.

Motorsports career results

NASCAR
(key) (Bold – Pole position awarded by qualifying time. Italics – Pole position earned by points standings or practice time. * – Most laps led.)

Winston Cup Series

ARCA Talladega SuperCar Series
(key) (Bold – Pole position awarded by qualifying time. Italics – Pole position earned by points standings or practice time. * – Most laps led.)

References

External links
 

1954 births
ARCA Menards Series drivers
NASCAR drivers
Canadian motorsport people
Living people
Racing drivers from British Columbia
Sportspeople from Victoria, British Columbia